Sworakowski is a Polish surname.

Juliusz Sworakowski (b. 1943) - Polish physicist
Witold Sworakowski (1903-1979) - Polish diplomat, archivist, professor of Stanford University